The R680 road is a regional road in Ireland. It travels from Clonmel, County Tipperary to Waterford city centre, via Carrick-on-Suir and Kilmeadan.

References

Regional roads in the Republic of Ireland
Roads in County Tipperary
Roads in County Waterford